Baby T-Rex is a platform game developed by Beam Software for Game Boy. It was released in 1993 in Europe by Laser Beam Entertainment, Beam's publishing arm. It was also released (with altered graphics and story) as Agro Soar in Australia, as Bamse in Sweden, and as We’re Back! A Dinosaur's Story in North America, where it was published by Hi Tech Expressions.

The following year Beam released a remake, Radical Rex, for Super NES, Sega Genesis and Sega CD.

Gameplay
In the original Baby T-Rex version of the game, players control an anthropomorphic skateboarding dinosaur, who must traverse various levels in order to save his girlfriend from the evil wizard Sethron. In the Agro Soar version of the game, players control Agro as he tries to escape a "pre-historic cartoon within his own TV" in which he is trapped by Sethron after he had insulted the wizard while watching the television show Curse of Sethron.

The Bamse version of the game sees Bamse, the world's strongest bear, and his rabbit friend Lille Skutt rescuing the inventor tortoise Skalman from the mischievous wolf Vargen after Skalman transports them to the age of the dinosaurs in a time machine he had built.

The We’re Back! A Dinosaur’s Story version of the game sees players control Rex, a Tyrannosaurus rex with enhanced intelligence who must rescue his three dinosaur friends Woog, Elsa and Dweeb from the film's villain Professor Screweyes.

Development
Beam actively sought to adapt the game for a number of different licensed properties in different countries around the world. Subsequently, the game was also released as We're Back! A Dinosaur’s Story, based on the 1993 film of the same name in North America, Bamse, based on the Swedish cartoon Bamse – Världens starkaste björn in Sweden, and Agro Soar, which stars the puppet children's television show host Agro from Beam's home country of Australia. These versions changed the story and the graphics (most notably the main character sprite, cutscenes and the title screen) to fit the license but kept the gameplay, level design and music intact.

Beam had also unsuccessfully pitched versions featuring the characters Sooty, Hugo and The Smurfs at various European trade fairs. A version of the game featuring Edd the Duck was completed and reviewed by Game Zone magazine in Britain but was pulled from distribution just before release when the BBC revoked the license. Decades later a ROM of the game was leaked onto the internet as part of the 2020 Nintendo data leak.

The game uses an in-house developed engine that was previously used in a Tom and Jerry game.

Reception
All versions of the game received average reviews.

References

External links

 

1993 video games
Dinosaurs in video games
Game Boy games
Game Boy-only games
Platform games
Side-scrolling video games
Skateboarding video games
Video games about children
Video games based on films
Video games based on animated television series
Video games based on television series
Video games developed in Australia
Video games set in prehistory